Ambrosia acanthicarpa is a North American species of bristly annual plants in the family Asteraceae. Members of the genus Ambrosia are called ragweeds. The species has common names including flatspine bur ragweed, Hooker's bur-ragweed, annual burrweed, annual bur-sage, and western sand-bur. The plant is common across much of the western United States and in the Prairie Provinces of Canada.

This spiny, weedy plant grows in clumps of many erect stems which may reach over a meter in height. Its gray-green stems are covered in a coat of stiff, bristly hairs. The few rough leaves are several centimeters long. The racemes of flowers are more plentiful, with each hairy flower head a few millimeters wide. The spiny, burr-like pistillate heads have pointed, twisting bracts and the staminate heads are rounded. The species is adaptable and grows well in disturbed areas, easily becoming weedy.

References

External links
Jepson Manual Treatment
Calphotos Photo gallery, University of California

acanthicarpa
Plants described in 1833
Taxa named by William Jackson Hooker
Flora of Western Canada
Flora of the Northwestern United States
Flora of the North-Central United States
Flora of the Southwestern United States
Flora of the South-Central United States